A cocktail is a mixed drink typically made with a distilled liquor (such as arrack, brandy, cachaça, gin, rum, tequila, vodka, or whiskey) as its base ingredient that is then mixed with other ingredients or garnishments.  Sweetened liqueurs, wine, or beer may also serve as the base or be added. If beer is one of the ingredients, the drink is called a beer cocktail.

Cocktails often also contain one or more types of juice, fruit, honey, milk or cream, spices, or other flavorings. Cocktails may vary in their ingredients from bartender to bartender, and from region to region. Two creations may have the same name but taste very different because of differences in how the drinks are prepared.

This article is organized by the primary type of alcohol (by volume) contained in the beverage. Cocktails marked with "IBA" are designated as IBA official cocktails by the International Bartenders Association, and are some of the most popular cocktails worldwide.

Absinthe

 Corpse reviver
 Chrysanthemum
 Death in the Afternoon
 Sazerac

Beer

Cocktails made with beer are classified as beer cocktails.

 Black and tan
 Black velvet
 Boilermaker
 Hangman's blood
 Irish car bomb
 Michelada
 Porchcrawler
 Queen Mary
 Sake bomb
 Shandy
 Snakebite
 U-boot

Brandy

 Blow my skull
 Brandy Alexander
 Brandy Manhattan
 Brandy sour
 Chicago cocktail
 Curaçao punch
 Diki-diki
 Four score
 French Connection
 Hennchata
 Hoppel poppel
 Horse's neck
 Incredible Hulk
 Jack Rose
 Paradise
 Pisco sour
 Porto flip
 Savoy affair
 Savoy corpse reviver
 Sazerac
 Sidecar
 Singapore sling (with cherry brandy) 
 Stinger
 The Blenheim
 Tom and Jerry

Cachaça

 Batida
 Caipirinha
 Caju amigo
 Leite de onça
 Quentão
 Rabo-de-galo

Gin

 20th century
 Angel face
 Aviation
 Bee's knees
 Bijou
 Blackthorn
 Bloody Margaret
 Bramble
 Breakfast martini
 Bronx
 Casino
 Cloister
 Clover Club cocktail
 Cooperstown cocktail
 Corpse reviver #2
 Damn the weather
 Derby
 Fluffy duck
 French 75
 Gibson
 Gimlet
 Gin and tonic
 Gin fizz
 Gin pahit
 Gin sour
 Greyhound
 Hanky panky
 John Collins
 Last word
 Lime Rickey
 Long Island iced tea
 Lorraine
 Martinez
 Martini
 Monkey gland
 My Fair Lady
 Negroni
 Old Etonian
 Paradise
 Pegu
 Pimm's cup
 Pink gin
 Pink lady
 Queens
 Ramos gin fizz
 Royal arrival
 Salty dog
 Shirley Temple Black
 Singapore sling
 Suffering bastard
 Takumi's aviation
 Tom Collins
 Tuxedo
 Vesper martini
 White lady or Delilah
 Wolfram

Ouzo

 Ouzini

Rum

 Ancient Mariner
 Airmail
 Bacardi
 Between the sheets
 Blow my skull
 Blue Hawaii
 Blue Hawaiian
 Bumbo
 Bushwacker
 Cobra's fang
 Cojito
 Cremat
 Cuban sunset
 Daiquiri
 Dark 'n' stormy
 El Presidente
 Fish house punch
 Flaming Doctor Pepper
 Flaming volcano
 Fluffy critter
 Fluffy duck
 Grog
 Gunfire
 Hoppel poppel
 Hot buttered rum
 Hurricane
 Jagertee
 Long Island iced tea
 Macuá
 Mai Tai
 Mary Pickford
 Mojito
 Mr. Bali Hai
 Painkiller
 Piña colada
 Planter's punch
 Q.B. Cooler
 Royal Bermuda
 Rum and Coke (a.k.a. Cuba libre)
 Rum swizzle
 Suffering bastard (Trader Vic version)
 Sumatra Kula
 Test pilot
 Ti' punch
 Tom and Jerry
 Tschunk
 Yellow bird
 Zombie

Sake

 Sake bomb
 Tamagozake

Tequila

 Adios motherfucker
 Aperol sunrise
 Arizona Biltmore
 Astronaut sunrise
 Batanga
 Bloody Maria
 Cantarito
 Chimayó cocktail
 Enamorada sunrise
 Florida sunrise
 Harlem mugger
 Juan Collins
 Long Island iced tea
 Margarita
 Matador
 Mexican martini
 Mojito blanco
 Paloma
 Sangrita
 Tequila slammer
 Tequila sour
 Tequila sunrise
 Tequila sunset
 Tommy's margarita
 Vampiro

Vodka

 Apple martini (a.k.a. appletini)
 Astro pop
 Batida (a variation, traditionally made with cachaça)
 Bay breeze
 Black Russian
 Bloody Mary
 BLT cocktail
 Blue Lagoon
 Bull shot
 Caesar
 Caipiroska (a.k.a. caipivodka)
 Cape Codder
 Chi-chi
 Colombia
 Cosmopolitan
 Dirty Shirley
 Espresso martini
 Flirtini
 Gimlet
 Glowtini
 Godmother
 Harvey Wallbanger
 John Daly (cocktail)
 Kamikaze
 Kensington Court special
 Lemon drop
 Link up
 Long Island iced tea
 Moscow mule
 Orange tundra
 Platinum blonde
 Porn star martini
 Red Russian
 Rose Kennedy cocktail
 Salty dog
 Screwdriver
 Sea breeze
 Sex on the beach
 Sloe comfortable screw up against the wall
 Tequila sunrise
 Vargtass
 Vesper
 Vodka gimlet
 Vodka martini (aka Kangaroo)
 Vodka McGovern
 White Russian
 Woo woo
 Wściekły pies
 Yorsh

Whisky

 Amber moon
 Black nail
 Blue blazer
 Bobby Burns
 Boulevardier
 Bourbon lancer
 Brooklyn
 Churchill
 Farnell
 Horsefeather
 Irish coffee
 Whiskey and Coke
 Jungle juice
 Lynchburg lemonade
 Manhattan
 Mint julep
 Missouri mule
 Nixon
 Old fashioned
 Old pal
 Rob Roy
 Rusty nail
 Sazerac
 Scotch and soda
 Seven and Seven or 7 & 7
 Three wise men
 Toronto
 Vieux Carré
 Ward 8
 Whiskey sour
 Whisky Mac

Wines

Fortified wines

The following drinks are technically cocktails because fortified wines are a mixture of distilled spirits and wine.
 Port wine: Cheeky Vimto
 Port wine: Portbuka
 Sherry and Vermouth: Adonis
 Sherry: Rebujito (dry sherry with soda)
 Sherry: Up to date

Wine

Wine variation

 Agua de Valencia
 Black velvet
 Death in the Afternoon
 Flirtini
 Prince of Wales

Sparkling wine
 Agua de Sevilla
 Spritz
 Bellini
 Hugo
 Rossini

Champagne

 Black velvet
 Chambord Royale
 Champagne cocktail
 French 75
 Kir royal
 Mimosa (a.k.a. Buck's fizz)
 Ochsenblut

Red wine

 Calimocho or Kalimotxo
 Mulled wine (Glögg)
 Tinto de verano
 Zurracapote

White wine
 Kir
 Spritzer

Flavored liqueurs

Anise-flavored liqueurs
Herbsaint
 Herbsaint frappé
Pastis
 Mauresque
 Perroquet
 Rourou
 Tomate

Chocolate liqueur
Chocolate martini

Coffee liqueurs

Coffee-flavored drinks

 B-52 (and related B-50 series cocktails)
 Baby Guinness
 Black Russian
 Espresso martini
 Moose milk
 Orgasm
 White Russian

Cream liqueurs
A liqueur containing cream, imparting a milkshake-like flavor

 B-52 (and related B-50 series cocktails)
 Baby Guinness
 Cement mixer
 Irish car bomb
 Oatmeal cookie
 Orgasm
 Quick fuck
 Slippery nipple
 Springbokkie

Crème de menthe
 Revelation

Crème de menthe – green
An intensely green, mint-flavored liqueur

 Grasshopper 
 Springbokkie

Crème de menthe – white
A colorless mint-flavored liqueur
 Stinger

Fruit liqueurs

Apple-flavored
 Apple-kneel

Orange-flavored

One of several orange-flavored liqueurs, like Grand Marnier, triple sec, or Curaçao
 Golden doublet
 Golden dream
 Moonwalk
 Skittle bomb

Other fruit flavors
Midori
A clear, bright-green, melon-flavored liqueur
 Japanese slipper
 Tequila sour

Nut-flavored liqueurs
Almond-flavored liqueurs

 Alabama slammer
 Amaretto sour
 Blueberry tea
 French Connection
 Godfather
 Godmother
 Orgasm

Swedish Punsch-flavored cocktails
Boomerang (cocktail)
Diki-diki
Doctor (cocktail)
Malecon

Misc. liqueur-based cocktails

 Backdraft (also a pepperdraft variation)
 Carrot cake
 Common market
 Jägerbomb
 Snowball – advocaat and soda lemonade

Less common spirits

Bitters

 Americano
 Brut cocktail
 Fernet con coca

Korn

Schneemaß

Pisco

 Aguaymanto sour
 Jazmin sour
 Mango sour
 Pisco sour

Schnapps

 Appletini
 Fuzzy navel
 Polar bear
 Redheaded slut

Other
 Jello shot
 Karsk
 Nutcracker
 Tamango

Historical classes of cocktails 

 Cobbler – traditional long drink that is characterized by a glass  filled with crushed or shaved ice that is formed into a centered cone, topped by slices of fruit
 Collins – traditional long drink stirred with ice in the same glass it is served in and diluted with club soda, e.g. Tom Collins
 Crusta – characterized by a sugar rim on the glass, spirit (brandy being the most common), maraschino liqueur, aromatic bitters, lemon juice, curaçao, with an entire lemon rind as garnish

 Daisy – traditional long drink consisting of a base spirit, citrus juice, sugar, and a modifier, typically a liqueur or grenadine. The most common daisy cocktail is the Brandy Daisy. Other commonly known daisies are the Whiskey Daisy, Bourbon Daisy, Gin Daisy, Rum Daisy, Lemon Daisy (the non-alcoholic variant), Portuguese Daisy (port and brandy), vodka daisy, and Champagne daisy. The Margarita and Sidecar are both variants of the Daisy; both use the simplest form of the specification (base spirit, citrus juice, and liqueur) with triple sec as the modifier; the former uses tequila as the base spirit and lime juice, while the latter uses brandy as the base spirit and lemon juice.
 Fix – traditional long drink related to Cobblers, but mixed in a shaker and served over crushed ice
 Fizz – traditional long drink including acidic juices and club soda, e.g. gin fizz
 Flip – traditional half-long drink that is characterized by inclusion of sugar and egg yolk
 Julep – base spirit, sugar, and mint over ice. The most common is the mint julep. Other variations include gin julep, whiskey julep, pineapple julep, and Georgia mint julep.
 Negus –  wine (often port wine), mixed with hot water, oranges or lemons, spices, and sugar
 Punch – wide assortment of drinks, generally containing fruit or fruit juice; see also punsch
 Rickey – highball made from usually gin or bourbon, lime, and carbonated water
 Sangria –  red wine and chopped fruit, often with other ingredients such as orange juice or brandy
 Shrub – one of two different types of drink – a fruit liqueur typically made with rum or brandy mixed with sugar and the juice or rinds of citrus fruit, or a vinegared syrup with spirits, water, or carbonated water
 Sling – traditional long drink prepared by stirring ingredients over ice in the glass and filling up with juice or club soda
 Smoking bishop – type of mulled wine, punch or wassail 
 Sour – mixed drink consisting of a base liquor, lemon or lime juice, and a sweetener
 Toddy – mix of liquor and water with honey or sugar and herbs and spices, served hot

By mixer

Strawberry 
Strawberries can be muddled or puréed and added to many drinks, and they are liquor-friendly, being compatible with, e.g., bourbon whiskey, Cointreau, vodka, tequila, rum, and Champagne, among other spirits and liqueurs and so on.

Some recipes call for a strawberry syrup that can be made using strawberries, vanilla extract, sugar, and water. Some strawberry cocktail recipes do not call for a syrup, but rely on puréed strawberries to play that part.

Strawberries are often mixed with basil. Strawberry is popular in smashes since after the beverage has been drank, the alcohol-infused strawberries can be consumed as well.

 Champagne bowler (Cognac, white wine, sparkling wine, simple syrup, strawberries)
 Cherub's cup (vodka, St. Germain elderflower liqueur, brut rosé sparkling wine, lemon juice, simple syrup, strawberry)
 Christmas Jones (vodka, sugar, pineapple juice, lemon-lime soda, strawberries)
 Fresh strawberry and lime Tom Collins (gin, lime juice, club soda, agave, strawberries)
 Kentucky kiss (Maker's Mark bourbon, lemon juice, maple syrup, club soda, strawberries)
 Strawberry beer margarita (tequila, Corona beer, limeade concentrate, lemon lime soda, strawberries)
 Strawberry berryoska (Russian standard vodka, lemonade, strawberries)
 Strawberry gin and tonic (gin, lime juice, orange bitters, tonic water, strawberry syrup)
 Strawberry gin smash (gin, strawberries, sugar, lime juice, elderflower liquor, club soda, mint sprigs)
 Strawberry mint sparkling limeade (Champagne, mint leaves, lime juice, honey)
 Strawberry pom mojito (white rum, mint leaves, lime juice, pomegranate juice, club soda or lime soda, strawberries)
 Strawberry rose gin fizz (gin, sugar, rose water, salt, club soda, strawberries)
 Strawberry smash (vodka, basil leaves, lemon juice, honey, club soda, strawberries)
 Strawberry whiskey lemonade (whiskey, lemon juice, strawberry syrup)

Carrot juice 
Carrot juice can be mixed with spirits such as agave spirits, whiskey, tequila, gin, or mezcal. Vodka is sometimes chosen because its neutral taste allows more of the carrot juice taste to shine through. Carrot juice can also be mixed with liqueurs such as amaro. ginger, orange, lemon and honey can be other ingredients in carrot juice cocktails. Turmeric infusions are also common. Examples of drinks made with carrot juice include:
24 Carrot Gold Punch (gin, carrot juice, pineapple juice, lemon juice, ginger beer, pineapple slices, edible flowers)
Jessica Rabbit (Big Gin, carrot juice, yellow Chartreuse, kümmel, lime juice, lime oleo saccharum, carrot top oil, arugula flower)

Pineapple juice 

 Chuck Yeager (named after American Air Force Pilot Chuck Yeager. Includes pineapple juice and Jägermeister)
 Electric shark (rum, blue curaçao, pineapple juice, ginger beer)
 Jungle bird (dark rum, campari, simple syrup, pineapple juice, lime juice)
 Piña colada (light rum, pineapple juice, cream of coconut)
 Shark bite (coconut rum, pineapple juice, blue curaçao)
 Wiki wiki (rum, mango brandy, lime juice, pineapple juice, cane syrup, kiwi)
 Yaka hula hickey dula (dark rum, dry vermouth, pineapple juice)

Smashed fruit 
A smash is a casual icy julep (spirits, sugar, and herb) cocktail filled with hunks of fresh fruit, so that after the liquid part of the drink has been consumed, one can also eat the alcohol-infused fruit (e.g. strawberries). The history of smashes goes back at least as far as the 1862 book How to Mix Drinks. The old-style whiskey smash was an example of an early smash.

The herb used in a smash is often mint, although basil is sometimes used in cocktails that go well with it, e.g. many strawberry cocktails. The name "smash" comes from the idea that on a hot day, one takes whatever fruit is on hand and smashes it all together to make a refreshing beverage. Generally a smash will have crushed ice.

 Apple bourbon smash (bourbon, honeycrisp apple, honey, lemon, nutmeg, cardamom)
 Blueberry smash (vodka, St. Germain elderflower liqueur, lemon rounds, lime rounds, blueberries, mint leaves)
 Bourbon blackberry smash (bourbon, lime juice, mint leaves, blackberries, simple syrup, club soda)
 Bourbon peach smash (bourbon, brown sugar simple syrup, peach, mint leaves, ginger beer or seltzer)
 Bourbon strawberry smash (bourbon, strawberries, simple syrup, lemon juice, mint leaves, club soda)
 Cranberry smash (vodka or bourbon, cranberries, mint leaves, lime, brown sugar, ginger ale)
 Grapefruit smash (cachaça, ruby red grapefruit, simple syrup, mint)
 Kiwi smash (gin, basil leaves, kiwifruit, honey syrup, lemon juice)
 Pear bourbon smash (bourbon, maple syrup, water, pear, mint leaves, lemon juice)
 Pineapple smash (spiced rum, pineapple rum, pineapple rings, lime juice, soda water)
 Raspberry smash (Champagne, vodka, lime wedges, sugar, raspberries)
 Watermelon smash (Vodka, watermelon juice, lemon juice, simple syrup, mint leaves)
 Whiskey smash (bourbon whiskey, muddled lemon wedges, simple syrup, and (optionally) muddled mint leaves)

Lemonade 
A number of hard lemonades, such as Lynchburg lemonade (whose alcoholic ingredient is Jack Daniel's Tennessee whiskey) have been marketed.

 Boozy frozen lemonade (limoncello, lemon vodka, or lemon liqueur; lemon; sugar; lemonade)
 Boozy lemonade sorbet (vodka, lemon sorbet, lemonade)
 Fireball lemonade (Fireball cinnamon whisky, grenadine, lemonade)
 Fresh raspberry vodka lemonade (vodka, raspberries, sugar, lemonade)
 John Daly (vodka, sweet iced tea, lemonade)
 Lemonade grape cocktail (vodka, triple sec, grape soda, lemonade)
 Lemonade margarita (tequila blanco, Cointreau, and either frozen lemonade from concentrate or a naturally sweetened lemonade made of lemon juice, maple syrup or agave, and water)
 Lemonade rum punch (coconut rum, dark rum, pineapple juice, lemonade)
 Long Island iced tea (vodka, tequila, gin, light rum, orange-flavored liqueur, simple syrup, lemon juice, cola carbonated beverage)
 Moscato lemonade (vodka, pink moscato, strawberry lemonade)
 Pink lemonade vodka punch (vodka, lemon-lime soda or club soda, raspberries, lemon, pink lemonade concentrate)
 Sangria lemonade (light rum, white wine, raspberries, orange, Granny Smith apple, lemonade)
 Sour apple smash (apple vodka, pineapple rum, apple pucker, lemonade)
 Spiked pineapple lemonade (vodka, pineapple, lemons or limes, mint, pineapple juice, lemonade)
 Strawberry lemonade margarita (tequila, triple sec, strawberries, limes, frozen lemonade)
 Tom Collins (gin, lemon juice, sugar, and carbonated water)
 Vodka lemonade slush (vodka, frozen lemonade concentrate, lemon zest)
 Watermelon vodka slush (vodka or watermelon vodka, watermelon, honey or simple syrup, lemonade)

Lemon-lime soda 
A lemon-lime soda cocktail is a cocktail made with lemon-lime soda such as Sprite.

 7 and 7 (whisky and 7 Up)
 Citrus splash (vodka, Sprite, and grapefruit juice)
 Corbins Riptide crash (blueberry vodka, Gatorade Frost Riptide Rush, Sprite)
 Mediterranean sunset (vodka, blood orange liqueur, Sprite, grenadine)
 Mexican martini (tequila, Cointreau, orange juice, lime juice, green olive brine, Sprite)
 Midori sour (melon liqueur, lime juice, lemon-lime soda)
 Orange crush (vodka, orange liqueur, navel orange, lemon-lime soda)
 Pimm's cocktail (Pimm's No. 1, lemon, ginger ale, cucumber, ice cubes, lemonade)
 Pink lemonade vodka punch (vodka, raspberries, lemon, pink lemonade concentrate, lemon-lime soda)
 Pink lemonade vodka slush (vodka, frozen pink lemonade concentrate, soda water, lemon-lime soda)
 Sex in the driveway (vodka, peach schnapps, blue curaçao, Sprite)
 Whiskey Sprite lime cocktail (Irish whiskey, Sprite, soda water, lime wedge)

Apple juice 
Hard cider has been produced by a number of companies, e.g. Woodchuck Hard Cider. Apple-flavored malt beverage products have also been sold by companies like Redd's Apple Ale, but these do not actually contain fermented apple juice.

 Angry hard cider slushie (white rum, lime juice, white sugar, strawberries, hard cider)
 Apple chai gin and tonic (dry gin, apple chai syrup, tonic)
 Appletini (vodka, Calvados, lemon juice, simple syrup, and Granny Smith apple juice)
 Boozy apple cider slushie (bourbon, brown-sugar cinnamon simple syrup, lemon juice, dry hard cider, apple cider or juice)
 Boozy cider slushie (bourbon, ginger beer, chai tea, lemon juice, apple cider)
 Bourbon cider slushie (bourbon, cinnamon vanilla syrup, lemon juice, apple cider)
 Hard apple cider slushie (Fireball whiskey, cinnamon or crushed Red Hots, hard apple cider)
 Szarlotka (Żubrówka vodka and unfiltered apple juice)

Grape juice 

 Boozy Concord-grape ice pops (gin, juniper berries, sugar, lime juice, Concord grape juice)
 Early morning piece (Jack Daniel's whiskey, orange juice, grape juice)
 Enzoni cocktail (gin, campari, lemon juice, simple syrup, fresh grapes)
 Episcopal punch (vodka, ginger ale, white sparkling grape juice)
 Frosty grape fizz (gin or vodka, orange liqueur, soda water, purple grape juice)
 Gin and grape juice
 Grape ape/bling bling (vodka, lemon-lime soda, grape juice)
 Grape fizz (Seagram's grape twisted gin, ginger ale, white grape juice)
 Grape quencher (vodka, triple sec, lime juice, grape juice)
 Grape rocket (whiskey, vodka, grape juice)
 Henry Joose (Bombay Sapphire gin, Seagram's Extra Dry gin, 7-up, cranapple juice, grape juice)
 Jeweler's hammer (vodka, soda water, grape juice)
 John Rocker (vodka, peach schnapps, white grape juice)
 Mardi grape (grape vodka, grapefruit juice, club soda, grape juice)
 Mardi Gras madness (vodka, pineapple juice, lemon-lime soda, grape juice)
 Purple rain (Greenbar Tru Lemon Vodka, Licor, lemon juice, grape juice)
 Transfusion (vodka, ginger syrup, lime juice, Concord grape juice ice cubes, and club soda)
 White grape margarita (tequila, triple sec, lime juice, white grape juice)

Ginger soda 
A ginger soda cocktail is a cocktail with ginger ale or ginger beer. Small Town Brewery produced the 5.90% ABV Not Your Father's Ginger Ale. Coney Island Brewing Co. Henry's Hard Soda produced the 4.2% ABV Henry's Hard Ginger Ale. Others have included Crabbie's Original Alcoholic Ginger Beer (4.8 percent) and Spiced Orange Alcoholic Ginger Beer (4.8 percent), Fentimen's Alcoholic Ginger Beer (4 percent), and New City Ginger Beer (8 percent).

 Cider and stormy (apple cider, dark rum, ginger beer)
 Dark 'n' stormy (rum and ginger beer)
 Desert healer (orange juice, gin, cherry brandy and ginger beer)
 Dirty Shirley (vodka, grenadine, and ginger ale)
 Ginger apple cooler (apple whiskey, maple syrup, lemon juice, ginger beer)
 Ginger fizz (gin, alcoholic ginger beer, muddled limes and cilantro)
 Horse's neck  (brandy and ginger beer)
 Irish mule (Irish whiskey, ginger ale, lime juice)
 Moscow mule (vodka, ginger beer, lime juice)
 Presbyterian (scotch and ginger ale)
 Screwdriver mule (Smirnoff Ice Screwdriver and ginger beer)
 Stoli alibi (vodka, ginger simple syrup, lime juice)
 White wine ginger spritz (dry white wine, ginger beer, lime juice)

Cola 
Some cola cocktails are made by the brewer; for example, McAles sells a "hard cola" that is a malt beverage with kola and other natural flavors and caramel color added. Jack Daniel's and Miller Brewing also introduced a hard cola, "Black Jack Cola". Henry's Hard Soda introduced a hard cherry cola.

 All American (bourbon, Southern Comfort, and Coke)
 Batanga (tequila and Coke)
 Chocolate Coke (white rum, chocolate liqueur, Kahlua, and Coke)
 Cuba libre (rum and coke)
 Dirty black Russian (vodka, coffee liqueur, and Coke)
 Whiskey and Coke
 Kalimotxo (red wine and Coke)
 Long Island iced tea (tequila, vodka, light rum, triple sec, gin, and a dash of Coke)
 Tequila and Coke

Tonic 
A tonic cocktail is a cocktail that contains tonic syrup or tonic water. Tonic water is usually combined with gin for a gin and tonic, or mixed with vodka. However, it can also be used in cocktails with cognac, cynar, Lillet Blanc or Lillet Rosé, rum, tequila, or white port.

 Albra (vodka, cynar, mint syrup, lemon juice, tonic water)
 Cucumber cooler (gin, cucumber juice, pineapple syrup, lime juice, tonic water)
 Gin and tonic
 Gunga din (gin, pineapple juice, lime juice, simple syrup, cardamom pods, tonic)
 Lavender blanc (Lillet blanc, Dolin blanc, lavender bitters, tonic water)
 Peach fever (tequila, Bénédictine, muddled peach, tonic syrup)
 Tequila and tonic (tequila, tonic water, lime juice)
 Vodka tonic
 Yellowjacket jubilee (gin, lavender cordial, ginger syrup, lemon juice, soda water)

See also 

 Beer
 Beer cocktails
 Cocktail garnishes
 Drink mixers
 Drinking game
 Drinkware
 Flaming drink
 Glassware
 Highball
 List of alcoholic drinks
 List of cocktails (alphabetical)
 List of IBA official cocktails
 List of liqueurs
 List of national drinks
 List of national liquors
 List of vodkas
 List of whisky brands
 Mixed drink shooters and drink shots
 Mixed drinks
 Non-alcoholic mixed drinks
 Pineapple juice cocktail
 Vermouth cocktails
 Wine cocktails

References

External links

Cocktails